Margaret Wendell Huntington (1867-1958 or 1955 )  American painter known for her landscapes and flowers.

Armory Show of 1913
Huntington was one of the artists who exhibited at the significant Armory Show of 1913 which included one of her oil paintings entitled Cliffs Newquay ($200).

She was a member of the National Association of Women Painters and Sculptors.

References

1867 births
1958 deaths
American women painters
19th-century American painters
20th-century American painters
20th-century American women artists
19th-century American women artists
National Association of Women Artists members